Michael Schütz (born 29 July 1963, Karlsruhe) is a German church musician, composer and university lecturer. He is especially dedicated to the connecting traditional musical styles with pop music styles, for songs of the genre Neues Geistliches Lied.

Compositions and arrangements 
 Segne dieses Kind, in Evangelisches Gesangbuch, Stuttgart, 1996
 Esslinger Orgelbuch, Carus, Stuttgart, 1996
 Gott gibt ein Fest, pop arrangements for groups in different formation, Strube, 1997
 Das ist ein köstlich Ding, pop arrangements for brass, Strube, 1999
 All Of You, pop piano book, Strube, 2001
 Down By The Riverside, spiritual for small choir, large choir, brass and band, Strube, 2001
 Gott lädt uns ein, arrangements for mixed choir, Strube, 2003
 Petrus, musical theatre for choir and band, Musisch-kulturelle Bildung, Stuttgart 2003
 The Traditional Gospel Book, 20 spirituals for choir a cappella, Strube, 2006
 The Traditional Gospel Book, 20 spiritual arrangements for piano, Strube, 2006
 The Traditional Gospel Book, 20 spirituals for choir and piano, Strube, 2006
 Welcome! pop pieces for brass ensembles, Strube, 2007
 20 Pop-Stücke für Orgel, Strube, 2008
 Als ob Gott selbst in uns sänge, pop arrangements for brass, band, choir and organ. Strube, 2009/2014
 I Like It Like That, 14 pop compositions for recorder and piano, Strube, 2011
 Just Michael, pop arrangements for brass, BrassOvation!, Hille, 2011
 Classic & Pop Crossover, 17 pop compositions for recorder and piano. Strube, 2012
 Vater unser, in Singt Jubilate, Strube, 2012
 Messe 2012, mass for mixed choir, string orchestra and band, Strube, 2013.
 Sein Lob wird euch entflammen. Psalmenmelodien der Reformation populär arrangiert für Bläser, Band, Chor und Orgel ad lib. (score),

References

External links 
 
 sona nova

German composers
Living people
1963 births
Musicians from Karlsruhe